Paolina Pezzaglia Greco (13 September 1886 – 17 December 1925) was an Italian theatre and film actress.

Early life
Pezzaglia was the only daughter of the VIP hair-stylist Gerolamo Pezzaglia (1854–1899) and Adelinda Monti (1854–1940). The family name was Pezzaglia, however, the variant spelling Pazzaglia is also found in some documents and sources. 

Her uncle was the actor and "capocomico" Angelo Pezzaglia, who encouraged her to start acting on stage. At the age of 6 she already enchanted the public in theatre, and she grew to be a popular actress, acting in more than 120 theatrical pieces throughout Italy, Switzerland, Tunisia, Spain and Egypt.

Career
She was first actress in Ermete Zacconi's "Compagnia", which was highly successful.

In 1914 Pezzaglia played the character of Sofia in the film Il fornaretto di Venezia, directed by Luigi Maggi. In 1918 she was cast as Biribì in the four-film serial movie Il mistero dei Montfleury. In 1918 she  performed in La capanna dello zio Tom, directed by Riccardo Tolentino, and Le peripezie dell'emulo di Fortunello e compagni, directed by Cesare Zocchi Collani, playing the character of Madama Girasole.

She was a nonconformist artist, playing also male or grotesque characters.

In 1921 she was in the cast of La vendetta dello scemo, directed by Umberto Mucci.

Death
Pezzaglia continued acting on stage till the end of her life, when, during a successful theatrical season, she died of pneumonia in Florence at the age of 39. She is buried at Trespiano Cemetery in Florence, Italy.

Personal life
In 1908 she married the actor Antonio Greco and they had a son, Ruggero. Antonio died in 1913, at 29. In 1920 she had a daughter, Anna, with the actor and producer Luigi Mottura, who was 16 years younger. The two never married.

In Popular Culture
The story of her life is told in the website "Archivio Pezzaglia-Greco" ("Pezzaglia-Greco Archive") by her grandson Gianni Greco, an Italian writer and radio-TV anchorman, with a lot of unpublished documents and photos. And in 2013 the Pezzaglia-Greco Archive was declared "of historical interest particularly important" by the Italian Ministry of Heritage and Culture and Tourism.

In Amber Tamblyn's book, Dark Sparkler (2015), Pezzaglia is mentioned in a poem.

Filmography 
Il fornaretto di Venezia (1914)
Muoio per lei! (1918)
La capanna dello zio Tom (1918)
Le peripezie dell'emulo di Fortunello e compagni (1918)
L'emulo di Fortunello direttore d'orchestra (1918)
Il mistero dei Montfleury (1918), serial movie in four full-length films:
Il campo maledetto
I bimbi di nessuno
La sagra dei martiri
Il giardino del silenzio
La vendetta dello scemo (1921)
Lo scemo Salvatore (1921)

References

External links 
Pezzaglia-Greco Archive 

1886 births
1925 deaths
Actresses from Milan
Italian stage actresses
Italian silent film actresses
20th-century Italian actresses
Deaths from pneumonia in Tuscany